Blowing Kisses is a Spanish television miniseries created by Aitor Gabilondo, written by Darío Madrona and directed by Iñaki Mercero. The two-part miniseries was released as a Star Original on Star via Disney+ on 26 March 2021 in Spain. In the UK and Ireland, the series premiered on Disney+ on 11 August 2021.

Premise 
Featuring the COVID-19 pandemic as backdrop, the fiction (presented as "romantic comedy" or "comedy drama") follows a number of initially unrelated love stories developed during the lockdown.

Part of the fiction happens in the same fictional hospital (Los Arcos) the Madres series is set.

Cast

Release

Production
The miniseries, consisting of two 80 minute long episodes, premiered on Disney+'s Star on 26 March 2021, with the second part scheduled for 2 April 2021. The platform was given a 9-month-long exclusivity on the content.

References

External links 
 Blowing Kisses on Disney+
 

Television series set in 2020
2021 Spanish television series debuts
2021 Spanish television series endings
2020s Spanish comedy television series
2020s Spanish drama television series
Television shows set in Spain
2020s romantic comedy television series
Spanish television miniseries
COVID-19 pandemic in Spain
Television shows about the COVID-19 pandemic
Spanish comedy-drama television series
2020s comedy-drama television series
Star (Disney+) original programming